Kielty is a surname. Notable people with the surname include:

Bobby Kielty (born 1976), American baseball player
Patrick Kielty (born 1971), Northern Irish comedian and television personality
Stan Kielty (1925–2008), English rugby league footballer